Gavin Lang (21 March 1926 – 19 February 1989) was a Scottish footballer, who played as a winger in the Football League for Chester.

His father Tommy was also a footballer whose longest spell was with Newcastle United in the 1930s.

References

1926 births
1989 deaths
Association football wingers
Partick Thistle F.C. players
Burnbank Athletic F.C. players
Scottish Junior Football Association players
Arbroath F.C. players
Scottish Football League players
Hereford United F.C. players
Spalding United F.C. players
Chester City F.C. players
English Football League players
Sportspeople from Larkhall
Scottish footballers
Footballers from South Lanarkshire